Adamu Abu Kasim is a Nigerian botanist and professor of science. He was appointed as vice chancellor of Ibrahim Badamasi Babangida University, Lapai by Abubakar Sani Bello, assumed office in December 2019.

Background 
He was born Dukku of Rijau, Niger State there he hails from. He had his early school in 1980 attending Central Primary School Dukku after which he obtained his secondary education in 1985 to 1987 from the Government Science College. Kagara. He then proceeded to Ahmadu Bello University, Zaria through the Interim Joint Matriculation Board Examination known as (IJMB) and in 1989 he gained a Bachelor of Science in Botany from the same Ahmadu Bello University graduating with a second class.

He also holds a M.Sc of Botany and PhD of crop breeding in Ahmadu Bello University, he then obtained a Certificate in Tissue Biotechnology in 1995 from the University of Nigeria, Nsukka.

Membership 
Membership organization held include:

 Genetic Society of Nigeria
 Teachers Association of Nigeria
 National Association of Nuclear Scientist and Science
 Botanical Society of Nigeria.

Notes 

Year of birth missing (living people)
People from Niger State
Ahmadu Bello University alumni
University of Nigeria alumni
Academic staff of Ibrahim Badamasi Babangida University
Nigerian biologists
Living people